Leong Jun Hao (born 13 July 1999) is a Malaysian badminton player. He was the boys' singles champion at the 2017 Asia Junior Championships. This achievement was followed by a silver medal at World Junior Championships.

Personal life
Leong was born and raised in Kuala Lumpur to Celine Low and Anthony Leong. He started playing badminton for fun outside his house. At the age of 9, he started playing the sport seriously under his father’s tutelage. Leong joined the Bukit Jalil Sports School (BJSS) at the age of 13. At the end of 2018, he injured his hip twice which resulted in his world ranking dropping from 40th to 120th.

Career 
In July 2017, Leong won the Asian Junior Championships by defeating Bai Yupeng in the final. In October 2017, he reached the final of World Junior Championships where he lost to top seed, Kunlavut Vitidsarn, 21–17, 15–21, 9–21. In November 2017, he reached his first maiden senior final at the Malaysia International Challenge before losing to compatriot Iskandar Zulkarnain Zainuddin.

In January 2018, he reached the final of the Thailand Masters as a qualifier where he lost to second seed, Tommy Sugiarto. In April 2018, he won his first senior title at the Finnish Open by defeating his compatriot Cheam June Wei in the final.

Achievements

BWF World Junior Championships 
Boys' singles

Asian Junior Championships 
Boys' singles

BWF World Tour (1 title, 1 runner-up) 
The BWF World Tour, which was announced on 19 March 2017 and implemented in 2018, is a series of elite badminton tournaments sanctioned by the Badminton World Federation (BWF). The BWF World Tours are divided into levels of World Tour Finals, Super 1000, Super 750, Super 500, Super 300 (part of the HSBC World Tour), and the BWF Tour Super 100.

Men's singles

BWF International Challenge/Series (1 title, 2 runners-up) 
Men's singles

  BWF International Challenge tournament
  BWF International Series tournament

References

External links 
 

1999 births
Living people
Malaysian sportspeople of Chinese descent
Malaysian male badminton players
Sportspeople from Kuala Lumpur
Badminton players at the 2018 Asian Games
Asian Games competitors for Malaysia
21st-century Malaysian people